The 2017 WK League was the ninth season of the WK League, the top division of women's football in South Korea. In the off-season, Gyeongju KHNP joined the league. Incheon Hyundai Steel Red Angels were the defending champions. The regular season began on 14 April 2017 and ended on 6 November 2017. Incheon Hyundai Steel Red Angels won their fifth consecutive league title.

Teams

Table

Results

Matches 1 to 14

Matches 15 to 28

Season statistics

Top scorers

Updated to games played on 6 November 2017.

Top assists providers

Updated to games played on 6 November 2017.

Play-offs
The semi-final was contested between the 2nd and 3rd placed teams (Icheon Daekyo and Hwacheon KSPO) in the regular season. After defeating Icheon Daekyo 2–1, Hwacheon KSPO advanced to the two-legged final to face the 1st placed team (Incheon Hyundai Steel Red Angels) in the regular season. Hwacheon KSPO lost 6–0 on aggregate to Incheon Hyundai Steel Red Angels, who won their fifth consecutive league title.

The semi-final was played as a single-elimination match, and the Championship Final over two legs.

Semi-final

Championship final
First leg

Second leg

Incheon Hyundai Steel Red Angels won 6–0 on aggregate.

References

External links
WK League official website 
Season on soccerway.com

2017
Women
South Korea
South Korea